Carlos Alberto Fenoy (born 15 October 1948) is an Argentine retired footballer who played as a goalkeeper, primarily in Spain, where he spent ten seasons in La Liga and is considered by Centro de Investigaciones de Historia y Estadística del Fútbol Español as one of the ten best Argentines to play in the league.

Career
Born in Buenos Aires, Fenoy began playing football with local side Newell's Old Boys. He also played for Newell's rivals Club Atlético Vélez Sarsfield before leaving for Spain in 1975.

Fenoy initially joined RC Celta de Vigo, then playing in the Segunda División, and the club was promoted to La Liga for the 1976–77 season. Fenoy had responsibility for taking penalties that season and scored five of six, making him Celta's leading goal-scorer (an unusual feat for a goalkeeper).

Celta suffered relegations in successive seasons, and Fenoy transferred to La Liga's Real Valladolid before the 1980–81 season. He would play eight seasons in La Liga with the club, amassing over 250 league appearances, and becoming one of the oldest ever players in La Liga (aged 39).

References

External links

1948 births
Living people
Argentine footballers
Newell's Old Boys footballers
Club Atlético Vélez Sarsfield footballers
RC Celta de Vigo players
Real Valladolid players
La Liga players